Tripoli Airport may refer to:

Greece 
Tripoli Airport (Greece), a small military airport in Tripoli, Greece

Libya 
Tripoli International Airport, international airport in Tripoli, Libya, used for commercial aviation
Mitiga International Airport, cargo airport in Tripoli, Libya, used for commercial/cargo and military aviation